Aschenborn is a surname. Notable people with the surname include:

 Dieter Aschenborn (1915–2002), Namibian painter, son of Hans
 Hans Aschenborn (1888–1931), German painter
 Uli Aschenborn (born 1947), South African painter, son of Dieter

German-language surnames